ABS-CBN News Channel, commonly known as ANC, is a 24/7 Philippine pay television news channel. It was launched in 1996 as the first all-news network in English language. The majority of its programs are produced by ABS-CBN News.
The channel is broadcast on terrestrial television in Guam through Dededo's channel 22. ANC is being broadcast from the ANC studio in ABS-CBN Newsroom, Studio 6 & Studio 7 in ABS-CBN Broadcasting Center in the Philippines. An international feed called ANC Global is also available worldwide as part of TFC premium channels via cable, satellite, iWantTFC and TFC IPTV.

History

The ABS-CBN News Channel was originally established in 1996 as the Sarimanok News Network or SNN. SNN was the brainchild of the late Eugenio Lopez, Jr. who envisioned a 24-hour television network that would become the primary source of news and information for Filipinos. On May 1, 1996, SNN was first offered on Sky Cable. Back then the channel served the viewers through two major news programs, Dateline Philippines and Primetime News, while short news advisories aired throughout the day.

To enhance its resources and strengthen its position as the primary news channel for the Filipinos, SNN in 1998 merged with Sky News, another Lopez-owned cable news channel that specialized in business news. The merger of the two networks paved the way for the formation of the country's first 24-hour news channel offering the latest in local and foreign news, business information, sports, weather updates and lifestyle. On October 11, 1999, the network changed its name to ABS-CBN News Channel or ANC.

In the years that followed, ANC established its name through its coverage of key events in the Philippines including the impeachment trial of Joseph Estrada, the Sipadan hostage crisis, the Oakwood mutiny, and EDSA Dos and Tres. ANC and ABS-CBN was also the first to reveal the Joseph Estrada's "brown envelope" controversy, Corazon Aquino's death, the Maguindanao massacre, and Hubert Webb's acquittal.

On November 4, 2011, ANC together with ABS-CBNnews.com and YouTube brought the YouTube World View event to the Philippines with an exclusive and one-on-one interview with the Philippine President Benigno Aquino III in Malacañang Palace. The questions was submitted and voted by YouTube users from all over the world.

On July 18, 2013, ANC announced a partnership with Yahoo!, which saw the introduction of a Yahoo! portal featuring content from ANC (which will remain separate from the main ABS-CBN News website), and would also allow ANC content to be featured on Yahoo! News Philippines. The partnership marks Yahoo's first partnership with a television news outlet outside of the United States, where Yahoo! has recently established a similar content partnership with ABC News. This joint-venture website was discontinued after it was revealed that Yahoo Philippines was discontinued in June 2015 (and thus redirecting the website to the Singaporean edition of Yahoo including the Malaysian edition) as an initiative to streamline "internal workflows" and currently redirects users to the ABS-CBNnews.com website. Before that partnership with Yahoo, the channel had its own dedicated website, ANCnews.tv until 2013.

In the early part of 2015, ANC has begun using English subtitles for the Tagalog soundbytes on newscasts and public affairs programs from ABS-CBN.

On October 26, 2015, ANC went into a major overhaul in its broadcast design, including the refurbished rhombus logo and the red-blue schemed new title cards for the channel's major newscasts. As part of the relaunch, ANC opened a new studio in 8 Rockwell in Rockwell Center in Makati, aside from their studio and newsroom in Quezon City. The Rockwell studio is used by programs such as Mornings @ ANC, Headstart with Karen Davila and #NoFilter a political program hosted by Teodoro Locsin Jr. and Professor Prospero de Vera of University of the Philippines. ANC also launched the new programming grid for weekdays which include the relaunch of Mornings @ ANC, the sports news program The Daily Serve hosted by  Gretchen Ho and business program The Boss hosted by Cathy Yap-Yang.

On March 15, 2016, as part of ANC's 20th anniversary, the channel launched its own HD feed. On May 9, 2016, ANC began a 48-hour extensive coverage of the 2016 Philippine election leading to the poll results.

On May 25, 2016, British billionaire and philanthropist Sir Richard Branson of Virgin Group headlined the first Asian Innovation and Entrepreneurship Forum, an ANC Leadership Series, the main event of the station's 20th anniversary.

On April 1, 2020, DZMM Radyo Patrol 630 and DZMM TeleRadyo has switched to simultaneous telecast with ANC starting at 10:00 p.m.; which evolved from its timesharing with the DZMM since March 19. With this move, DZMM and DZMM TeleRadyo, as well as the provincial regional AM radio station, become English-only (for the first time in history after many years) as a provisional measure. This programming scheme ended on April 20. However, it was retained until May 15 from 11:00 p.m. until 5:00 a.m. It was resumed in 2021 from 10:00 p.m. until 5:30 a.m. of the following day.

From October 31, 2020, the channel aired DZMM TeleRadyo programming instead on late night timeslots due to the coverage of Typhoon Goni (Rolly) and Typhoon Vamco (Ulysses).

COVID-19 pandemic and ABS-CBN shutdown 
The production of the ANC's Sunday news programs was halted on March 22, 2020, due to the implementation of enhanced community quarantine to help control the spread of the COVID-19 pandemic in the Philippines. Furthermore,  with the network shutting down operations due to the expiration of its legislative franchise and in compliance with the NTC's cease and desist order, the current status of the newscast remained unknown until it was eventually cancelled & franchise denial last July 10, 2020, citing numerous violations. It was then replaced by provisional programming on the same date. On April 26, 2020, when the timesharing of programming between both DZMM TeleRadyo and ANC ended, the Sunday edition remained off-air. as of November 2020, it airs between Monday to Saturday, with the simulcast broadcast of TV Patrol as the only Sunday newscast of the channel.

Programming

The programming of ANC is focused primarily on news, business, and politics with weather updates, sports news, informative, religious and lifestyle programs as secondary contents. The network also shows documentaries and television specials, as well as select programs from ABS-CBN, ABS-CBN Regional Channel, ABS-CBN TeleRadyo and The Filipino Channel. In case of developing stories, sudden breaking news or even important or scheduled live coverage, ANC pre-empts its regularly scheduled programming to give way for the developing news stories and/or coverage as it happens. Regular scheduled programs resume once the coverage of an important event has ended.

Hosts and news anchors

Current

Former

See also
A2Z
ABS-CBN (inactive channel)
Kapamilya Channel
ABS-CBN News and Current Affairs (ABS-CBN's news division)
TeleRadyo (a 24-hour Filipino-language cable news channel)
One PH
One News
CNN Philippines

References

External links

 
24-hour television news channels in the Philippines
Television networks in the Philippines
English-language television stations in the Philippines
Television channels and stations established in 1996
Assets owned by ABS-CBN Corporation
ABS-CBN Corporation channels